Lendvai is a surname. Notable people with the surname include:

Ernő Lendvai (1925–1993), Hungarian music theorist
Erwin Lendvai (1882–1949), Hungarian composer and choral conductor
Ildikó Lendvai (born 1946), Hungarian politician
Miklós Lendvai (born 1975), Hungarian football player
Paul Lendvai (born 1929), Hungarian-born Austrian journalist 
Tibor Lendvai (born 1940), Hungarian cyclist